The 2014 Cincinnati Bearcats football team represented the University of Cincinnati in the 2014 NCAA Division I FBS football season.  The team played its home games at Paul Brown Stadium in Cincinnati, Ohio due to the renovation at Nippert Stadium, which was completed at the start of the 2015 football season. The Bearcats were led by second-year head coach Tommy Tuberville. They finished the season 9–4, 7–1 in AAC play to finish in a three way tie for the America Athletic championship. They were invited to the Military Bowl where they lost to Virginia Tech.

Schedule

Schedule Source:

Game summaries

Toledo

Miami (Ohio)

Ohio State

Memphis

Miami (FL)

SMU

South Florida

Tulane

East Carolina

UConn

Temple

Houston

Virginia Tech

Personnel

Depth chart

Awards and milestones

American Athletic Conference honors

Offensive player of the week
Week 3: Gunner Kiel
Week 5: Chris Moore
Week 12: Gunner Kiel

Defensive player of the week
Week 13: Jeff Luc
Week 14: Nick Temple

Special Teams player of the week
Week 3: Sam Geraci
Week 8: Andrew Gantz
Week 9: Andrew Gantz
Week 12: Andrew Gantz

American Athletic Conference All-Conference First Team

Eric Lefeld, OT
Parker Ehinger, OG

Terrell Hartsfield, DL
Jeff Luc, LB

American Athletic Conference All-Conference Second Team
Andrew Gantz, K

American Athletic Conference All-Conference Honorable Mention
Gunner Kiel, QB
Nick Temple, LB

References

Cincinnati
Cincinnati Bearcats football seasons
American Athletic Conference football champion seasons
Cincinnati Bearcats football